() is a 2006 biopic film directed by Tian Zhuangzhuang of the renowned twentieth century Go master Wu Qingyuan, better known as Go Seigen, the Japanese pronunciation of his name. The film, which premiered at the 44th New York Film Festival, focuses on the life of this extraordinary player from his meteoric rise as a child prodigy to fame and fortune as a revolutionary strategic thinker, as well as the tumultuous global conflicts between his homeland and his adopted nation. The film also features a scene involving the Atomic bomb go game. The film also screened at the AFI's China Film Festival in Silver Spring, Maryland.

Plot
The Go Master shines a light on the life and times of Wu Qingyuan, pronounced Go Seigen in Japanese. Wu is considered the greatest Go player of the 20th century, his talents bringing him from his native China to a professional career in Japan when he was only a teenager. Based on Wu's autobiography, this elegantly shot and remarkably restrained biopic follows the life of a singular figure, fascinating not only for his genius and achievements in the game of Go, but also for his unique experiences as a Chinese man in Japan during an immensely turbulent period in history. Acclaimed Taiwanese actor Chang Chen (Crouching Tiger Hidden Dragon) portrays the titular role in a subtle, poignant performance that is as penetrating as it is opaque, underlying the brooding lyricism of the film. The Go Master co-stars Sylvia Chang, Matsuzaka Keiko, Emoto Akira, and Ito Ayumi, and Wu Qingyuan himself appears briefly in the film's prologue. Also of note is the film's costume design, which is by renowned designer Wada Emi (Ran, Hero, House of Flying Daggers).

With the breakout of the Sino-Japanese War in the 1930s, Wu Qingyuan (Chang Chen) and his family are thrown into an uncomfortable and dangerous position as Chinese nationals residing in Japan. While Wu's family returns to China, he chooses to stay behind in his adopted country to continue to pursue the game of Go. In the quiet recluse of his school, there are no politics, only the singular dedication to his art and the love for his wife Kazuko (Ayumi Ito). However, the chaos of the times eventually forces him out of his enclave, throwing his life and mind into conflict.

Wu's career ends abruptly when he is struck by a motorcycle in a collision which does not appear to be an accident. This real-life incident may have been a conspiracy against him by opponents in the world of Go, where he remained an unshakable winner. He is later hospitalized and can no longer play Go, due to brain trauma. Despite this, the film ends nostalgically in the golden room of Go.

Cast
 Chang Chen - Wu Qingyuan
 Sylvia Chang - Shu Wen
 Akira Emoto - Kensaku Segoe
 Ayumi Ito - Kazuko Nakahara
 Xin Baiqing - Wu Yan
 Keiko Matsuzaka - Fumiko Kita
 Kaho Minami - Nagako Nagaoka
 Hironobu Nomura - Yasunari Kawabata
 Takashi Nishina - Minoru Kitani
 Nao Omori - Utaro Hashimoto
 Takayuki Inoue - Shusai Honinbo
 Betty Huang - Wu Qingying
 Li Xuejian - Li Yutang

Productions
Wu Qingyuan is played by Taiwanese actor Chang Chen.  Chang was nominated for the 2006 Golden Horse Award for best actor for his portrayal. The real Wu Qingyuan makes a short cameo appearance in the film's prologue. Produced by Liu Xiaodian with executive producers Wang Jun, Own Chen, Wouter Barendrecht, and Michael J. Werner. The screenplay was written by Ah Cheng. Costume design was by the acclaimed Emi Wada, famous for such films as Kurosawa's Ran, Dreams, as well as Zhang Yimou's Hero and House of Flying Daggers.

Critical reception
A.O. Scott of The New York Times called The Go Master "a stately and respectful biopic", as well as "deliberate and contemplative rather than dramatic or psychologically probing" and "gorgeously shot". The film was nominated for Achievement in Cinematography at the 2007 Asia Pacific Screen Awards.

References

External links
 
 
 
 
 The Go Master at Fortissimo Films

2006 films
Chinese biographical films
2000s Mandarin-language films
Films directed by Tian Zhuangzhuang
Go films
Films with screenplays by Ah Cheng
Films with screenplays by Zou Jingzhi
Second Sino-Japanese War films